Public diplomacy of Israel is the use of public diplomacy in favor of the State of Israel, i.e. efforts aimed at communicating directly with citizens of other countries to inform and influence them so that they support or tolerate the Israeli government's strategic objectives.

Terms and types 
Different terms have been used to describe Israel's and other actors' efforts to reach audiences abroad.

Among early Zionists it was common to label communicative efforts propaganda. Theodor Herzl used the term at the 3rd Zionist Congress in 1899, where he asked fellow Zionists in the audience "to engage in propaganda". At the time the term "propaganda" was considered neutral. The term is now pejorative. Propaganda is now typically used for official government statements or by critics of pro-Israeli advocacy groups to portray the communication as misleading and manipulative.

Hasbara was formally introduced to the Zionist vocabulary by Nahum Sokolow. Hasbara has no direct English translation, but roughly means "explaining". It is a communicative strategy that "seeks to explain actions, whether or not they are justified". As it focuses on providing explanations about one's actions, hasbara has been called a "reactive and event-driven approach".

Today, Israeli practitioners tend to label their communicative efforts "public diplomacy", not hasbara, indicating a shift in strategy. They consider a focus on "explaining" too defensive and prefer to actively determine the agenda by being less reactive and more proactive, moving to a more comprehensive, long-term strategic approach.

Israeli public diplomacy encompasses different forms of communication and other forms of interaction with the public abroad. For instance, Israel engages in open and fully attributable, unidirectional mass communication that targets so far unaffiliated civil populations in other countries (a form of communication Hirschberger defines as "external communication"), both via social media and traditional mass media. The Israeli government uses this type of communication especially to depict Israel positively (a communication strategy Hirschberger calls "branding"). The Israeli government and pro-Israeli groups also use interventive communication to counter what they see as attempts at delegitimisation of Israel, e.g., in the context of BDS. The Israeli government also engages in activities beyond communicative efforts in social media and the traditional mass media, e.g., in the form of cultural diplomacy. The communicative efforts of pro-Israeli civil society groups are partially also called "advocacy".

Actors 
Various branches of the Israeli government as well as pro-Israeli civil society organizations engage in public diplomacy efforts:

 Spokesperson's Unit of the IDF: The spokesperson's unit of the Israeli Defense Forces (IDF) plays a central role in the Israeli government's public diplomacy. The IDF's English-language Facebook page is one of the most-followed army social media worldwide. The unit has become Israel's largest spokesperson unit, with more than 400 officers, civilians and soldiers. There is also a reserve unit of almost 1,200 soldiers and officers. As of 2017, the unit has 15 staff members that are responsible only for the IDF's social media platforms to reach audiences abroad. As of 2015, the IDF is active on 30 different social media platforms.
 Spokesperson's Unit of COGAT: The Coordination of Government Activities in the Territories (COGAT), the IDF unit responsible for coordination and liaison with the Palestinian Authority, has a spokesperson's unit of its own as well as its own social media channels in English and Arabic.
 Prime Minister's Office (PMO): Within the Israel Prime Minister's Office, the Government Press Office (GPO), the Public Diplomacy Directorate and the National Information Directorate are involved in public diplomacy efforts. The National Information Directorate is in charge of coordinating "the public diplomacy activities of various governmental bodies in foreign and security affairs, and on socioeconomic issues" (Israel PMO s.a.). The Public Diplomacy Directorate is responsible for communicating the Prime Minister's and the government's policies and decisions. The directorate is headed by the Prime Minister's Media Advisor. 
 Ministry of Foreign Affairs (MFA): The Israeli Ministry of Foreign Affairs also has a Public Diplomacy Directorate. "The directorate consists of the Media and Public Affairs Division, the Division for Cultural Affairs and Scientific Cooperation and the Bureau for Religious Affairs and Relations with the Jewish Diaspora. The Media and Public Affairs Division comprises one department in charge of 'branding', a department in charge of collecting information, producing visual media content such as videos and drafting policy papers for briefing Israeli missions all around the world, as well as the spokesperson’s bureau, which is in charge of the relationship with the press. Furthermore, the division also has an academic department and a small department dealing with issues of civil society affairs, especially the battle against BDS. Finally, the ministry has also a Digital Diplomacy Department, which is in charge of all digital channels of the ministry".
 Pro-Israeli civil society organizations: Various civil society organizations and initiatives from Israel and abroad support the Israeli public diplomacy efforts. Prominent examples are StandWithUs, the American Israel Public Affairs Committee (AIPAC), the Washington Institute for Near East Policy (WINEP), the Anti-Defamation League (ADL), Christians United for Israel (CUFI),  the Israel on Campus Coalition, the AMCHA Initiative and "The David Project".
 Masbirim Israel: In 2010, the Israeli Ministry of Information and Diaspora Affairs launched the PR campaign "Masbirim Israel". The campaign intended to encourage Israeli citizens to contribute to improving Israel's image by talking with their international contacts about the country.

History

1970-1999
Early mentions of the term hasbara in English mainstream print media date from the late 1970s and describe it as "overseas image-building." According to The Washington Post, this work "is called hasbara when the purpose is to reshape public opinion abroad." In the early 1980s, hasbara was defined as a "public relations campaign." In Newsweek it was described as "explaining." In 1986, The New York Times reported that a program for "communicating defense goals" was started in the late 1970s, and a 1984 implementation of a "Hasbara Project" to "train foreign-service officers in communications by placing them with American companies." Carl Spielvogel, chairman of Backer & Spielvogel, traveled to Israel to advise the government on communicating its defense goals. The trip led to the Hasbara Project, an internship program established to train foreign-service officers in communications by placing them with American companies.

Shmuel Katz's book Battleground: Fact and Fantasy in Palestine, published in 1973, was described as "an encyclopedic source-book for those involved in Israel's hasbara (public relations) effort" by Moshe Phillips, a national director of  Herut North America's U.S. section. In 1977, Prime Minister Menachem Begin named Katz "Adviser to the Prime Minister of Information Abroad."

In May 1992, The Jerusalem Post reported that American Jewish leaders hardly reacted to news that the Foreign Ministry's hasbara department would be eliminated as part of a sweeping reorganization of the ministry. Malcolm Hoenlein noted there had been talk of streamlining the ministry's hasbara functions for some time. He said that merging the hasbara department's functions with those of the press department did not portend any downgrading in the priority the Likud government gives to hasbara abroad. Abe Foxman reacted similarly, saying he was "not distressed or disturbed", and noted that disseminating hasbara has always been the responsibility of every Foreign Ministry staff officer, especially those working abroad; if eliminating one department means everyone will assume greater responsibility for his or her own efforts in distributing hasbara, then he is all in favor. It also reported that personnel in foreign hasbara departments would be shifted to press departments, which is where much of the work currently done by hasbara officials properly belongs. He explained that Israel's efforts to provide hasbara abroad would focus on media communications.

2000-2009
In 2001, Shmuel Katz published a retrospective of Israeli hasbara efforts and said that hasbara "must be tackled not by occasional sudden sallies but by a separate permanent department in the government." Sharon did increase hasbara efforts, but did not create a cabinet-level ministry for that purpose.

Also in 2001, the Israeli Foreign Affairs Ministry, the diplomatic arm of the Government of Israel, was an original co-sponsor of the Hasbara Fellowships activities of Aish HaTorah. The Jewish Agency for Israel, Department for Jewish Zionist Education, operates a campaign called "Hasbara, Israeli Advocacy, Your Guide to the Middle East Conflict". In May 2007, the Hasbara Fellowships asserted that "Wikipedia is not an objective resource but rather an online encyclopedia that any one can edit. The result is a website that is in large part is controlled by 'intellectuals' who seek to rewrite the history of the Arab-Israeli conflict. These authors have systematically yet subtly rewritten key passages of thousands of Wikipedia entries to portray Israel in a negative light. You have the opportunity to stop this dangerous trend! If you are interested in joining a team of Wikipedians to make sure Israel is presented fairly and accurately, please contact [our] director". A similar advocacy campaign on Wikipedia was later launched by the Committee for Accuracy in Middle East Reporting in America in May 2008; five editors involved in the campaign were sanctioned by Wikipedia administrators, who wrote that Wikipedia's open nature "is fundamentally incompatible with the creation of a private group to surreptitiously coordinate editing".

In 2002, the Israeli State Comptroller's office issued a report critical of Israel's PR efforts. "A lack of an overall strategic public relations conception and objective" and lack of coordination between the various organizations were mentioned. Funding levels are modest; the Ministry of Foreign Affairs spent about US$8.6 million on these efforts in 2002, and the Government Press Office was budgeted at US$100,000.

In 2008, Yarden Vatikay was appointed to coordinate Israel's domestic and foreign media policy.

In 2009, Israel's foreign ministry organized volunteers to add pro-Israeli commentary on news websites. In July 2009, it was announced that the Israeli Foreign Ministry would assemble an "internet warfare" squad to spread pro-Israel messages on various websites, with funding of 600,000 shekels (about $150,000).

2010 to present
A 2010 report produced for the Israeli cabinet by the Reut Institute and cited by the newspaper Haaretz exemplifies the common Israeli view that hasbara efforts are needed to respond to what it describes as a diffuse "delegitimization network" of anti-Israel activists. As Haaretz put it, "The network's activists—'delegitimizers' the report dubs them—are relatively marginal: young people, anarchists, migrants and radical political activists." The newspaper also cites the report as saying this network promotes pro-Palestinian activities in Europe as "trendy," and calls for it to be monitored by Israeli intelligence services, and for the cabinet to treat the network as a strategic threat. It concludes that Israel was not prepared to meet the threat this network posed and that a counter-effort must be more vigorously undertaken to respond to it.

Neil Lazarus says that what he calls "low budget, grassroots Hasbara 2.0" has come of age, and commends websites that keep track of what supporters see as anti-Israel media bias, and that promote email campaigns on Israel's behalf. He observes that "Israel's hasbara seems to be becoming more dynamic, as the Diaspora takes responsibility", and that "Even day schools and MASA programs have been conscripted to the task."

Methods
The Israel Citizens Information Council (ICIC) says its purpose is "to assist efforts to explain Israeli life from the vantage point of the average Israeli citizen. Towards that end, the ICIC enlists Israelis from all walks of life to participate in its various projects ... One of our major activities is the production of special Powerpoint presentations which we post on our website. These presentations review specific aspects and issues related to Israel and the Middle East."

Some hasbara experts study methods used by Palestinian activists and offer advice on how to respond. Describing demonstrators as "youths," for example, creates a different impression from calling them "children." They draw attention to the subtle differences of meaning between words such as demonstration and riot, terror organization and Palestinian political organization. They advise against name calling and point scoring.

Edward Said wrote that hasbara methods used during the Second Intifada included lunches and free trips for influential journalists; seminars for Jewish university students; invitations to congressmen; pamphlets and donation of money for election campaigns; telling photographers and writers what to photograph or write about; lecture and concert tours by prominent Israelis; frequent references to the Holocaust; advertisements in the newspapers attacking Arabs and praising Israel.

The Israeli Foreign Ministry has instituted new training on the appropriate use of social media methods in its hasbara strategy. There have been multiple instances where embarrassing and inappropriate tweets and posts by the Israeli Embassies, particularly the one in Ireland under the leadership of Boaz Moda'i, have brought international condemnation. In response to such incidents, Israel's Foreign Ministry updated online social media guidelines for worldwide representatives of the Israeli government, so that the "combat doctrine" of the media guide will include appropriate "Do's and Don'ts."

Shaping foreign public opinion

Israeli officials have emphasized the importance of molding American public opinion to influence U.S. foreign policy favourably toward Israel. For example, Prime Minister Benjamin Netanyahu has said, “In the last 30 years, I appeared innumerable times in the American media and met thousands of American leaders. I developed a certain ability to influence public opinion." Netanyahu made this statement in the context of the Israeli government's decade-long effort to pressure for military action against Iran. He added that this "is the most important thing: the ability to sway public opinion in the United States against the regime in Iran.”

Coordination with diaspora Zionist organizations

Major American Jewish organizations have played a significant role in advancing an Israeli state narrative to the American public. Rabbi Alexander M. Schindler, former chair of the Conference of Presidents of Major American Jewish Organizations, has said, "The Presidents' Conference and its members have been instruments of official governmental Israeli policy. It was seen as our task to receive directions from government circles and to do our best no matter what to affect the Jewish community." Similarly, Hyman Bookbinder, a high-ranking official of the American Jewish Committee, has said, "Unless something is terribly pressing, really critical or fundamental, you parrot Israel's line in order to retain American support. As American Jews, we don't go around saying Israel is wrong about its policies."

Mitchell Bard has written, "by framing the issues in terms of the national interest, AIPAC can attract broader support than would ever be possible if it was perceived to represent only the interests of Israel. This does not mean AIPAC does not have a close relationship with Israeli officials; it does, albeit unofficially. Even so, the lobby sometimes comes into conflict with the Israeli government."

According to Shivi Greenfield and Nachman Shai, the Israeli government (particularly the Ministry of Foreign Affairs, the former Ministry of Public Diplomacy & Diaspora Affairs, and the Ministry of Tourism) has worked with various Israeli and international non-government organizations to promote Israeli public diplomacy within the global Jewish diaspora and international community. Notable Israeli NGOs involved in public diplomacy have included the Jewish Agency for Israel, Israel Project, HonestReporting, the Middle East Media Research Institute (MEMRI), and Palestine Media Watch (PMW).  The Israeli government has also partnered with several Jewish and Christian Zionist NGOs in the U.S. and abroad, including the Anti-Defamation League (ADL), American Israel Public Affairs Committee (AIPAC), American Jewish Committee (AJC), the Conference of Presidents of Major American Jewish Organizations, Christians United for Israel (CUFI), the Jewish Federations of North America (JFNA), and the Zionist Organization of America (ZOA).

According to Greenfield and Shai, the Israeli government and sympathetic NGOs, including Hillel International, B'nai B'rith, Israel at Heart, and StandWithUs, have sought to promote sympathy for Israel among university students through study tours (such as Birthright Israel and Masa Israel, talks, meetings, distributing educational materials, distributing educational materials, gift packages, fundraising, and blood donations. These campus outreaches seek to strengthen ties between Israel and the Jewish diaspora and support efforts by Jewish students to combat so-called "anti-Israel" activism on campus such as Israeli Apartheid Week. Shai identifies the "Israel on Campus Coalition" as the umbrella organization for most pro-Israel American campus organizations. It is funded by the Schusterman Foundation and Hillel.

According to Shahar Burla, the Israeli Foreign and Public Diplomacy ministries worked with local Australian Jewish community and Zionist organizations such as the local chapter of the United Israel Appeal, the Australasian Union of Jewish Students, the Zionist Council of New South Wales and the New South Wales Jewish Board of Deputies to mobilize Australian Jews into supporting Israeli hasbara efforts during the 2010 Gaza flotilla raid. The Ministry of Public Diplomacy and Diaspora Affairs established a "Communications Room" to circulate pro-Israel information to the global Jewish diaspora. These mobilization efforts via email messages, websites, traditional media, meetings and demonstrations. Pro-Israel sympathizers were encouraged to share pro-Israel videos and articles on social media platforms, respond to blogs and TV shows, and write editorial letters.

Further reading

See also

 Act.IL
 Hasbara Fellowships
 IDF Spokesperson's Unit
 Israeli Military Censor
 Jewish Internet Defense Force
 Media coverage of the Arab–Israeli conflict
 Media Watch International
 New antisemitism
 Pallywood
 We Con the World

References

External links
Israel to pay students to defend it online, USAToday, 2013
Occupation of the American Mind, Al Jazeera English, 2017

Public diplomacy
Public relations
Foreign relations of Israel
Propaganda by topic
Propaganda in Israel
Propaganda in the United States